General election were held in Monaco on 16 June 1929 to elect the 12 members of the National Council. The national councilmen were elected by a 30-member Electoral College.

Electoral College 
The 30-member Electoral College consisted of nine members elected by the Communal Council and 21 members elected by voters. The Electoral College also includes three substitute members elected by the Communal Council and six substitute members elected by voters.

Members elected by Communal Council 
The Communal Council held an election for nine members and three substitute members of the Electoral Council on 23 May 1929.

Members elected by voters 
An election of the remaining 21 Electoral College members and six substitute members was held on 26 May 1929.

Results

References

Elections in Monaco
Monaco
Parliamentary election
June 1929 events in Europe